Donga Ramudu may refer to:
 Donga Ramudu (1955 film), an Indian Telugu-language drama film
 Donga Ramudu (1988 film), a  Telugu-language action film